Andhra Jyothi is the third largest circulated Telugu language daily newspaper of India sold mostly in the states of Andhra Pradesh and Telangana. It was founded by K. L. N. Prasad, an Industrialist on 1 July 1960. It is also one of the oldest running Telugu language daily newspapers. It was taken over by Vemuri Radha Krishna, also known as R. K. in 2002 who also works as the Managing Director.

Details 
It is published from 21 centers across the states of Andhra Pradesh, Telangana, Karnataka, and Tamil Nadu. Vemuri Radhakrishna, a senior journalist turned entrepreneur is its Managing Director and noted litterateur K. Srinivas is its Editor. It is the third-largest circulated Telugu daily, according to the Audit Bureau of Circulation (ABC) and is known for its dynamic political reporting. Andhra Jyothi has a vast reporting network in every nook and corner of Andhra Pradesh and Telangana and also has a considerable presence in New Delhi, Tamil Nadu, Karnataka, Orissa, and Chhattisgarh. The group also owns a Telugu TV news channel ABN Andhra Jyothi and a weekly magazine Navya.

Political Impact 
Though initially started out as a neutral and non-political party oriented newspaper and was later taken over by a different organisations, the newspaper under this organization became an arch-rival to the current Chief Minister of Andhra Pradesh Y. S. Jagan Mohan Reddy and his political party YSR Congress Party. The newspaper and its Managing Director Vemuri Radha Krishna are often criticized for publishing news in the support of Chandrababu Naidu led Telugu Desam Party.

References

External links 
 Andhra Jyothi official website

Telugu-language newspapers
1960 establishments in Andhra Pradesh
Newspapers published in India
Newspapers published in Vijayawada
Newspapers published in Hyderabad